John Sloane (1779May 15, 1856) was a U.S. Representative from Ohio and later the Treasurer of the United States.

Born in York, Pennsylvania, Sloane moved to Ohio in early youth. He completed preparatory studies. He served as member of the Ohio House of Representatives from 1803–1805 and again in 1807. Sloane served as colonel of militia in the War of 1812.
United States receiver of public moneys at Canton, Ohio from 1808 to 1816 and at Wooster 1816-1819.

Sloane was elected as a Democratic-Republican to the Sixteenth and Seventeenth Congresses, reelected as an Adams-Clay Republican to the Eighteenth Congress, and elected as an Adams candidate to the Nineteenth and Twentieth Congresses (March 4, 1819 – March 4, 1829). He served as chairman of the Committee on Elections (Seventeenth through Twentieth Congresses).

He was appointed clerk of the court of common pleas of Wayne County in 1831 and served several years. He was the Secretary of State of Ohio, 1841–1844.

Sloane was Treasurer of the United States from November 27, 1850, to April 6, 1853.
He died in Wooster, Ohio, May 15, 1856.  He was interred in Oak Hill Cemetery.

Notes

Sources

External links

 

1779 births
1856 deaths
Burials in Ohio
Speakers of the Ohio House of Representatives
Politicians from York, Pennsylvania
People from Wooster, Ohio
American militiamen in the War of 1812
Secretaries of State of Ohio
Treasurers of the United States
American militia officers
Democratic-Republican Party members of the United States House of Representatives from Ohio
Ohio National Republicans
19th-century American politicians
National Republican Party members of the United States House of Representatives
Members of the Ohio House of Representatives
Military personnel from Pennsylvania